Elections to the 53rd Parliament of New South Wales were held on Saturday 22 March 2003. All seats in the Legislative Assembly and half the seats in the Legislative Council were up for election. The Labor Party led by Bob Carr won a third four-year term against the Liberal-National Coalition led by John Brogden.

Future New South Wales premiers, Gladys Berejiklian and Kristina Keneally, entered parliament at this election.

Background

In the 18 months following the 1999 election politics was swamped by the Olympics. The only problem in this period was an administrative disaster in organising the ballot to purchase tickets. Games organisers were trying to hold back tickets originally promised at a lower price to the public in an attempt to deal with the financial viability of the Olympics. Chikarovski remained as Liberal leader after the 1999 election, partly because no-one wanted the job before the Olympics, but also because there was no clear alternative. A challenge finally occurred in March 2002, and Pittwater MP John Brogden, after six years in Parliament, was elected to the leadership on his 33rd birthday.

After the Olympics, the Government faced two major problems. The first was the police. The Government had appointed an
outsider, Englishman Peter Ryan, as new Commissioner to implement the reforms proposed by the Police Royal Commission. By 2001, police issues had moved on from corruption and returned to law and order, with the Government in particular under pressure over so-called "ethnic" crime in Western Sydney. Both Police Minister Paul Whelan and Commissioner Ryan were pushed into retiring, and new Minister Michael Costa was brought in to control the issue in the run-up to the 2003 election.

The second problem was the rail system. In a bid to create efficiencies, the Government had split the rail system into distinct organisations covering track, rolling stock, freight and passengers. Following a spate of accidents, including fatalities at Springwood in December 1999, a commission of inquiry was appointed. Its findings were that the accidents stemmed from confusion in the new structure of the rail system, and also a failure by the railway organisation to view safety as an operational goal. Another accident at Waterfall a month before the official start of the election campaign looked set to make rail safety a critical election issue, but the cause turned out to be the demise of the driver at the controls. Events after the election were to reveal major problems in the rail system, but they were not to become major issues in the campaign.

The 2003 election was almost a repeat of the 1999 result. The Liberal Party regained South Coast but lost the outer Sydney seat of Camden. The National Party regained Clarence with the retirement of Harry Woods, but lost Monaro to the Labor Party. Worse for the National Party, both Tamworth and Port Macquarie were lost to Independents: Tamworth after having been regained at a 2001 by-election, Port Macquarie after the decision of the National MP to leave the Party.

On the surface the result looked a repeat of 1999, but on closer analysis, Labor had increased its hold on Government. Despite a statewide two-party swing of just 0.2% to Labor, the party increased its margins in key seats. The seats clustered around the bottom of the electoral pendulum ahead of the 1999 election were now all safe seats for the Government. With another redistribution due before the next election in 2007 election, Labor appeared to have entrenched itself in power.

The election was the second to be fought by Carr as the incumbent Premier and became the first incumbent Premier to fight back to back elections since Neville Wran. To date Carr is also the last Premier to fight a second consecutive election.

In his concession speech Brogden promised that he will be back for the 2007 election but it was a promise that was not kept as he resigned as Liberal leader and then from Parliament in 2005.

Electoral system 

The New South Wales Legislative Assembly consists of 93 members, elected in single-member electorates by optional preferential voting.

The New South Wales Legislative Council consists of 42 members, elected at large by optional preferential single transferable voting, with 21 elected at each election to serve two Legislative Assembly terms.

Terms are fixed at four years, with elections being held in late March.

Results

Legislative Assembly

{{Australian elections/Title row
| table style = float:right;clear:right;margin-left:1em;
| title        = New South Wales state election, 22 March 2003
| house        = Legislative Assembly
| series       = New South Wales state election
| back         = 1999
| forward      = 2007
| enrolled     = 4,272,104 
| total_votes  = 3,924,676 
| turnout %    = 91.87%
| turnout chg  = -1.25%
| informal     = 102,872
| informal %   = 2.62%
| informal chg = +0.11%
}}

|}

{{bar box|float=right|title=Popular vote|titlebar=#ddd|width=600px|barwidth=410px|bars=

}}

Legislative Council

{{Australian elections/Title row
| table style = float:right;clear:right;margin-left:1em;
| title        = New South Wales state election, 22 March 2003
| house        = Legislative Council
| series       = New South Wales state election
| back         = 1999
| forward      = 2007
| staggered    = yes
| enrolled     = 4,272,104
| total_votes  = 3,931,308
| turnout %    = 92.02
| turnout chg  = –1.11
| informal     = 209,851
| informal %   = 5.34
| informal chg = –1.83
}}
	

|}

Overview 
In the New South Wales Legislative Assembly:
the Labor Party won 55 seats
the Liberal Party won 20 seats
the National Party won 12 seats
independent candidates won 6 seats
Elections were held for half the seats in the New South Wales Legislative Council:
the Labor Party won 10 seats for a total of 18
the Liberal Party won 5 seats for a total of 9
the National Party won 2 seats for a total of 4
the Greens won 2 seats for a total of 3
the Christian Democratic Party won 1 seat for a total of 2
the Shooters Party won 1 seat for a total of 1
the Australian Democrats won 0 seats for a total of 1
 One Nation NSW won 0 seats for a total of 1
the Unity Party won 0 seats for a total of 1
the Outdoor Recreation Party won 0 seats for a total of 1
 Reform the Legal System won 0 seats for a total of 1

Seats changing hands

§ Tamworth was won by the Nationals in a 2001 by-election and the shown swing is based on it. At the 1999 election it was won by independent Tony Windsor.

 Members' names shown in italics did not recontest their seats.

Post-election pendulum

See also 
 Candidates of the 2003 New South Wales state election
 Post-election pendulum for the 2003 New South Wales state election

References 

The lone Liberal who pierced Labor's ranks
Nori survives Greens challenge
Battling Cansdell gives Nationals a glimmer of light in the north
Psephos: Election of 27 March 2003, Legislative Assembly (Statewide summary)

Elections in New South Wales
2003 elections in Australia
2000s in New South Wales
March 2003 events in Australia